Chelsea Roffey (born 1 August 1981) is a journalist and a goal umpire in the Australian Football League (AFL).

Roffey was born in South Australia. In 1999, she would begin her goal umpiring career in Brisbane, Queensland, eventually making her AFL goal umpiring debut in 2004. Roffey became the first woman to officiate an AFL Grand Final when she was selected as goal umpire for the 2012 Grand Final.

References

Living people
Australian Football League umpires
Australian journalists
Sportswomen from Queensland
1981 births